The Louis Vuitton Trophy was a series of four match race regattas in International America's Cup Class boats, held between November 2009 and November 2010.

The Louis Vuitton Trophy was organised after the success of the Louis Vuitton Pacific Series in Auckland and the continued legal battle surrounding the America's Cup yachting competition at the time.  Because of the long delays from the legal action, and the fact that the 33rd America's Cup became a Deed of Gift match without a defender or challenger selection series, the Louis Vuitton Trophy series was established as a competition for other America's Cup racing syndicates.

Each of the four Trophy regattas featured between eight and ten teams in a round robin, with two teams advancing to a final to determine that regatta's Trophy winner.  Five syndicates lent their own International America's Cup Class boats for shared use in the regattas, making participation more affordable for the teams.

Supported by Louis Vuitton, the World Sailing Team Association and a group of ten America's Cup syndicates from seven countries, these relatively low cost events running on loaned boats kept syndicates active while waiting for the 8th Louis Vuitton Cup to determine the challenger for the 34th America's Cup.

Name
The series was originally launched as the Louis Vuitton World Series but after a request from the International Sailing Federation (ISAF) the name was changed to the Louis Vuitton Trophy.

Teams

Venues

A trophy was awarded to the winner at each of the four events, held in four countries between November 2009 and November 2010.

A fifth event was scheduled for January, 2011. San Diego submitted a bid for a sixth, March 2011 event, while various cities/countries (Russia, Greece, Newport, Valencia, Cape Town and Abu Dhabi) expressed an interest in bidding for future Trophy regattas.

The fifth event in the Louis Vuitton Trophy series – and all future Trophy plans – were set aside when the plans for the 34th America's Cup were announced.

Yachts
All events used International America's Cup Class yachts, lent to the regatta by various syndicates.

See also
 Louis Vuitton Cup
 Louis Vuitton Pacific Series

References

External links
Official Site

Louis Vuitton regattas
International America's Cup Class
2009 in sailing
2010 in sailing
Sailing series